{{Automatic taxobox
| fossil_range = 
| image = Waptia diagram.jpg
| image_caption = Diagram of Waptia
| image2 = Canadaspis perfecta USNM 57703.jpg
| image2_caption = Fossil of Canadaspis perfecta
| taxon = Hymenocarina
| authority = Størmer, 1944
| subdivision_ranks = Genera
| subdivision = *Balhuticaris
Canadaspis
Ercaicunia
Fibulacaris
Jugatacaris
Nereocaris
Odaraia
Pakucaris
Perspicaris
Plenocaris
Synophalos
Xiazhuangocaris
Pectocaris
Clypecaris
Vermontcaris
?Forfexicaris
?Occacaris
?Yunnanocaris
?Erjiecaris
?Pseudoarctolepis
TuzoiidaeTuzoiaDuplapexProtocarididaeTokummiaBranchiocarisProtocarisLoricicarisWaptiidaeWaptiaPauloterminusSynophalos?
| synonyms = Canadaspidida Novozhilov in Orlov, 1960
}}

Hymenocarina is an order of extinct arthropods known from the Cambrian. They possess bivalved carapaces, typically with exposed posteriors. Members of the group are morphologically diverse and had a variety of ecologies, including as filter feeders and as predators. Recent research has generally considered them to be stem or crown group members of Mandibulata, due the presence of mandibles in at least some species.

 Taxonomy 
Hymenocarines are characterized by the combination of following characters: bivalved, convex carapace covering cephalothoracic region; cephalothorax bearing multisegmented antennules and rounded mandibles, alongside post-maxillular limbs with spiny, subdivided basis and endopods with well-developed terminal claws; absence of appendages between antennules and mandibles; median sclerite and lobate protrusions located between compound eyes; posterior tagma (abdomen) with ring-like segments and terminated by a pair of well-developed caudal rami.

Based on the interpretation of simple head region that possess only a few segments and appendages, hymenocarine taxa were thought to be part of the upper stem-group euarthropods in early and mid 2010s. They later became widely accepted as mandibulates (jawed arthropods) after the discovery of their mandible-bearing mouthparts in late 2010s. Since then, most phylogenetic analysis suggest hymenocarines represent part of the mandibulate stem-group, with some results suggest a rather crownward position such as stem-pancrustaceans, stem-myriapods, stem-hexapods or somewhere in-between the former taxa.

Several subgroups within the order are recognised, including Waptiidae and Protocarididae.

Cambrian bivalved arthropods are now recognised to be a polyphyletic group, with other groups of bivalved arthropods such as Isoxys,  Bradoriida and Phosphatocopina only distantly related to Hymenocarina. Chuandianella a bivalved arthropod morphologically similar to Waptia and long thought to be closely related was reinterpreted as a non-hymenocarine euarthropod based on a restudy published in 2022, which found that it definitely lacked mandibles, characteristic of true hymenocarines.

Diversity
The group was very diverse in shape, with some forms like Waptia somewhat resembling shrimp, and others like Odaraia having a large carapace and trifurcate tail. The appendages showing various degrees of specialization across the group, ranging from the feathery gills of Waptia to the robust claws of Tokummia. Hymenocarines are thought to have been ecologically diverse, with various forms occupying scavenging, predatory, deposit feeding and suspension feeding niches.

References

See also 

 

 
Cambrian first appearances
Cambrian arthropods